The Little Shawangunk Kill is a tributary of the Shawangunk Kill in Orange County, New York in the United States. It rises in the southwest corner of Wallkill and flows northward.

References

External links
U.S. Geological Survey Geographic Names Information System

Rivers of Orange County, New York
Shawangunks
Rivers of New York (state)